The 1572 papal conclave (May 12–13), convoked after the death of Pope Pius V, elected Cardinal Ugo Boncompagni, who took the name Gregory XIII.

List of participants 

Pope Pius V died on May 1, 1572 at the age of 68. Up to date, he is the only canonized Pope between Celestine V (1294) and Pius X (1903 – 1914). Fifty three out of sixty six Cardinals participated in the election of his successor:

Giovanni Girolamo Morone (created Cardinal on June 2, 1542) – Cardinal-Bishop of Ostia e Velletri; Dean of the Sacred College of Cardinals; Cardinal-protector of Austria; Cardinal-protector of the Order of Cistercians; Cardinal-protector of the Ethiopian Catholic Church
Cristoforo Madruzzo (June 2, 1542) – Cardinal-Bishop of Porto e Santa Rufina; Sub-Dean of the Sacred College of Cardinals; Bishop of Brixen; Legate in Gualdo; Governor of Spoleto
Otto Truchess von Waldburg (December 19, 1544) – Cardinal-Bishop of Palestrina; Bishop of Augsburg; Cardinal-protector of Germany
Alessandro Farnese (December 18, 1534) – Cardinal-Bishop of Frascati; commendatario of S. Lorenzo in Damaso; Archpriest of the patriarchal Vatican Basilica; Vice-Chancellor of the Holy Roman Church; Archbishop of Monreale; Cardinal-protector of the Kingdom of Poland and of the Kingdom of Sicily; Cardinal-protector of the Republic of Genoa and of the Republic of Ragusa; Cardinal-protector of the Orders of Benedictines and Servites
Giulio Feltre della Rovere (July 27, 1547) – Cardinal-Bishop of Sabina; Archbishop of Ravenna; Governor of Loreto; Cardinal-protector of the Order of Capuchins
Giovanni Ricci (November 20, 1551) – Cardinal-Bishop of Albano; Archbishop of Pisa
Scipione Rebiba (December 20, 1555) – Cardinal-Priest of S. Maria in Trastevere; Protopriest of the Sacred College of Cardinals
Fulvio della Corgna, O.S.Io.Hieros. (November 20, 1551) – Cardinal-Priest of S. Adriano; Bishop of Perugia
Niccolò Caetani (December 22, 1536) – Cardinal-Priest of S. Eustachio; Archbishop of Capua; Cardinal-protector of Scotland
Ippolito II d'Este (December 20, 1538) – Cardinal-Priest of S. Maria Nuova; Cardinal-protector of France
Giacomo Savelli (December 19, 1539) – Cardinal-Priest of S. Maria in Cosmedin; Vicar General of Rome; Administrator of Benevento
Luigi Cornaro (November 20, 1551) – Cardinal-Priest of S. Marco; Camerlengo of the Holy Roman Church
Giovanni Antonio Serbelloni (January 31, 1560) – Cardinal-Priest of S. Angelo in Pescheria; Bishop of Novara
Carlo Borromeo (January 31, 1560) – Cardinal-Priest of S. Prassede; Archbishop of Milan; Grand penitentiary; Archpriest of the patriarchal Liberian Basilica; Cardinal-protector of Switzerland, Low Countries and Portugal; Cardinal-protector of the Orders of the Knights Hospitaller, Franciscans, Carmelites and Barnabites
Mark Sittich von Hohenems Altemps (February 26, 1561) – Cardinal-Priest of S. Giorgio in Velabro; Bishop of Constance; Archpriest of the patriarchal Lateran Basilica; Governor of Capranica
Alfonso Gesualdo (February 26, 1561) – Cardinal-Priest of S. Cecilia; Archbishop of Conza
Giovanni Francesco Gambara (February 26, 1561) – Cardinal-Priest of S. Prisca; Bishop of Viterbo
Stanisław Hozjusz (February 26, 1561) – Cardinal-Priest of S. Clemente; Ambassador of Poland before the Holy See; Bishop of Warmia
Antoine Perrenot de Granvelle (February 26, 1561) – Cardinal-Priest of S. Pietro in Vincoli; Viceroy of the Kingdom of Naples; Archbishop of Mechelen
Ludovico Madruzzo (February 26, 1561) – Cardinal-Priest of S. Onofrio; Bishop of Trent
Innico d'Avalos d'Aragona, O.S.Iacobis. (February 26, 1561) – Cardinal-Priest of S. Lorenzo in Lucina; Bishop of Mileto
Francisco Pacheco de Toledo (February 26, 1561) – Cardinal-Priest of S. Croce in Gerusalemme; Bishop of Burgos; Cardinal-protector of Spain
Girolamo di Corregio (February 26, 1561) – Cardinal-Priest of S. Anastasia; Archbishop of Taranto
Marco Antonio Colonna (March 12, 1565) – Cardinal-Priest of SS. XII Apostoli; Archbishop of Salerno
Tolomeo Gallio (March 12, 1565) – Cardinal-Priest of S. Agata in Suburra; Archbishop of Manfredonia
Prospero Pubblicola Santacroce (March 12, 1565) – Cardinal-Priest of S. Maria degli Angeli; Bishop of Kissamos; Administrator of Arles
Marcantonio Bobba (March 12, 1565) – Cardinal-Priest of S. Silvestro in Capite; Bishop of Aosta
Ugo Buoncompagni (March 12, 1565) – Cardinal-Priest of S. Sisto; Prefect of the Signature of Apostolic Briefs
Alessandro Sforza (March 12, 1565) – Cardinal-Priest of S. Maria in Via; Bishop of Parma; Legate in Bologna and Romagna
Flavio Orsini (March 12, 1565) – Cardinal-Priest of S. Marcellino e Pietro; Bishop of Spoleto; Administrator of Cosenza
Francesco Alciati (March 12, 1565) – Cardinal-Priest of S. Maria in Portico; Prefect of the S.C. of the Tridentine Council; Bishop of Città; Cardinal-protector of Spain and Ireland; Cardinal-protector of the Order of Carthusians
Alessandro Crivelli (March 12, 1565) – Cardinal-Priest of S. Maria in Aracoeli
Benedetto Lomellini (March 12, 1565) – Cardinal-Priest of S. Sabina; Bishop of Anagni; Legate in Campagna e Marittima
Guglielmo Sirleto (March 12, 1565) – Cardinal-Priest of S. Lorenzo in Panisperna; Bishop of Squillace; Librarian of the Holy Roman Church
Gabriele Paleotti (March 12, 1565) – Cardinal-Priest of SS. Giovanni e Paolo; Archbishop of Bologna
Michele Bonelli, O.P. (March 6, 1566) – Cardinal-Priest of S. Maria sopra Minerva; Superintendent general of the Papal States; Cardinal-protector of the Order of Dominicans and of the Kingdom of Hungary
Gianpaolo Della Chiesa (March 24, 1568) – Cardinal-Priest of S. Pancrazio; Prefect of the Tribunal of the Apostolic Signature of Justice
Marcantonio Maffei (May 17, 1570) – Cardinal-Priest of S. Callisto
Pier Donato Cesi (May 17, 1570) – Cardinal-Priest of S. Vitale
Charles d'Angennes de Rambouillet (May 17, 1570) – Cardinal-Priest of S. Eufemia; Ambassador of France before the Holy See; Bishop of Le Mans
Felice Peretti Montalto, O.F.M.Conv. (May 17, 1570) – Cardinal-Priest of S. Girolamo degli Schiavoni; Bishop of Fermo
Giovanni Aldobrandini (May 17, 1570) – Cardinal-Priest of S. Simeone; Bishop of Imola
Girolamo Rusticucci (May 17, 1570) – Cardinal-Priest of S. Susanna; Cardinal Secretary of State; Bishop of Senigallia
Archangelo de' Bianchi, O.P. (May 17, 1570) – Cardinal-Priest of S. Cesareo in Palatio; Bishop of Teano
Paolo Burali d'Arezzo, C.R.Theat. (May 17, 1570) – Cardinal-Priest of S. Pudenziana; Bishop of Piacenza
Vincenzo Giustiniani, O.P. (May 17, 1570) – Cardinal-Priest of S. Nicolo fra le Immagini
Gian Girolamo Albani (May 17, 1570) – Cardinal-Priest of SS. Giovanni a Porta Latina
Girolamo Simoncelli (December 22, 1553) – Cardinal-Deacon of SS. Cosma e Damiano; Administrator of Orvieto
Ludovico d'Este (February 26, 1561) – Cardinal-Deacon of S. Lucia in Silice; Administrator of Auch and Ferrara
Ferdinando de' Medici (January 6, 1563) – Cardinal-Deacon of S. Maria in Domnica; Legate in Perugia
Guido Luca Ferrero (March 12, 1565) – Cardinal-Deacon of SS. Vito e Modesto; Bishop of Vercelli
Antonio Carafa (March 24, 1568) – Cardinal-Deacon of S. Eusebio; Prefect of the Tribunal of the Apostolic Signature of Grace; Cardinal-protector of Maronites
Giulio Acquaviva d'Aragona (May 17, 1570) – Cardinal-Deacon of S. Teodoro

Twenty six electors were created by Pius IV, fourteen by Pius V, eight by Pope Paul III, four by Julius III and one by Pope Paul IV.

Absentees

Thirteen Cardinals were absent:

Georges d'Armagnac (December 19, 1544) – Cardinal-Priest of S. Nicola in Carcere Tulliano; Administrator of Toulouse; Co-Legate in Avignon; Royal Governor of Languedoc
Henry of Portugal (December 16, 1545) – Cardinal-Priest of SS. IV Coronati; Inquisitor General of the Portuguese Inquisition; Legate a latere in Portugal; Regent of the Kingdom of Portugal
Charles de Lorraine-Guise (July 27, 1547) – Cardinal-Priest of S. Apollinare; Archbishop of Reims
Charles I de Bourbon-Vandôme (January 8, 1548) – Cardinal-Priest of S. Crisogono; Archbishop of Rouen; Administrator of Beauvais; Legate in Avignon
Louis de Lorraine de Guise (December 22, 1553) – Cardinal-Priest of S. Tommaso in Parione; Bishop of Metz
Zaccaria Delfino (March 12, 1565) – Cardinal-Priest of S. Maria in Aquiro; Bishop of Hvar
Diego de Espinosa (March 24, 1568) – Cardinal-Priest of S. Stefano al Monte Celio; Bishop of Sigüenza; Grand Inquisitor of Spain
Gaspar Cervantes de Gaeta (May 17, 1570) – Cardinal-Priest of S. Balbina; Archbishop of Tarragona
Giulio Antonio Santorio (May 17, 1570) – Cardinal-Priest of S. Bartolomeo all'Isola; Archbishop of Santa Severina
Nicolas de Pellevé (May 17, 1570) – Cardinal-Priest of [no title assigned]; Archbishop of Sens
Innocenzo del Monte (May 30, 1550) – Cardinal-Deacon of S. Maria in Via Lata; Protodeacon of the Sacred College of Cardinals
Antoine de Créquy Canaples (March 12, 1565) – Cardinal-Deacon of S. Trifonio; Bishop of Amiens
Giovanni Francesco Commendone (March 12, 1565) – Cardinal-Deacon of S. Ciriaco alle Terme

Four were created by Paul III, another four by Pius V, three by Pius IV and two by Julius III.

Divisions among Cardinals 

The College of Cardinals was divided into several factions. Most of the creatures of Pius IV followed the leadership of his nephews Carlo Borromeo and Marcus Sitticus von Hohenems. Michele Bonelli, grand-nephew of Pius V, was a leader of cardinals elevated by this pontiff. Alessandro Farnese was still very influential, and had adherents not only among the creatures of his grandfather Paul III. The interests of Grand Duchy of Tuscany were under the care of Cardinal Alessandro de' Medici, son of Grand Duke Cosimo I de Medici, while those of Philip II of Spain were represented by Pacheco and Granvelle. Cardinal Rambouillet was the main representative of Charles IX of France in the conclave.

Candidates to the Papacy

Cardinals Farnese, Savelli, Correggio, Ricci and Boncompagni were considered as the main papabili. Farnese was the most active in promoting his own candidature, but he met also with the strongest opposition. His main opponent was Cardinal Medici, because of the rivalry between the House of Medici (Grand Duchy of Tuscany) and the House of Farnese (Duchy of Parma) in Northern Italy. Also king Philip II of Spain opposed Farnese's candidature, because he considered his elevation dangerous to the balance of power in Italy. The worldly Farnese was also unacceptable to the austere Carlo Borromeo. It was generally expected that conclave would last very long, possibly even several months.

The conclave 

Fifty-two Cardinals entered the conclave on May 12. On that same day in the evening they were joined by one more, Granvelle, Viceroy of Naples and official representative of Philip II of Spain. The first step taken by Granvelle was to inform Alessandro Farnese that the King of Spain would not accept his election and to ask him to withdraw his candidature in order to maintain peace in Italy. Surprised, Farnese understood that with such strong opposition he would never obtain the required majority, but, admitting his defeat, he wished to be able to use his influence effectively in the choice of the new pontiff. Almost the whole next day leaders of the main factions: Farnese, Bonelli, Granvelle and Borromeo, spent looking for a compromise candidate, and finally agreed to elect the 70-year-old Ugo Boncompagni. The first scrutiny took place on May 13 at six o'clock in the evening. At the end of the phase of accessus Ugo Boncompagni was elected Pope, receiving all votes except of his own, which he gave to Granvelle. He accepted his election and took the name of Gregory XIII, in honour of Pope Gregory I.

The people of Rome were surprised with such a quick election, but they welcomed the new pope, because he was neither religious nor an austere "Theatine", as most people had feared. On May 25 Gregory XIII was solemnly crowned by Cardinal Protodeacon Innocenzo del Monte.

Notes

Sources 
 Vatican History: an account of the papal conclave, 1572 in German
 List of participants of papal conclave, 1572 by S. Miranda
 Ludwig von Pastor, History of the Popes vol. XIX, London 1930

1572 in the Papal States
1572
16th-century elections
1572 in politics
16th-century Catholicism
1572 in Europe